Aéropostale may refer to:

Aéropostale (aviation), formerly la Compagnie générale aéropostale, a defunct French airmail company
Aéropostale (clothing), an apparel retailer

See also
 Aeropostal Alas de Venezuela
 Airmail